Goondiwindi is a rural town and locality in the Goondiwindi Region, Queensland, Australia. It is on the border of Queensland and New South Wales.

Geography
Most of the area surrounding the town is farmland.

History

Bigambul (also known as Bigambal, Bigumbil, Pikambul, Pikumbul) is an Australian Aboriginal language spoken by the Bigambul people. The Bigambul language region includes the landscape within the local government boundaries of the Goondiwindi Regional Council, including the towns of Goondiwindi, Yelarbon and Texas extending north towards Moonie and Millmerran.

In the late 1840s, squatters Richard Purvis Marshall and his brother Sampson Yeoval Marshall established the Gundi Windi pastoral station on the McIntyre River. They faced strong Aboriginal resistance for the first few years of their occupancy until Frederick Walker and the Native Police under his command arrived to crush most of the opposition in mid 1849. Richard Purvis Marshall became a Native Police officer in 1850 and was later appointed Commandant of the force in 1855.

The name Goondiwindi derives from an Aboriginal word with goondi indicating droppings or dung and windi indicating duck, probably connected with the roosting place on a large rock in the Macintyre River. The name was believed to be first used for a pastoral run in the area.

On 19 June 1860, the Queensland Government sold town and country lots in the village of Goondiwindi.

Gundiwindi Post Office opened by 1860. It was renamed Goondiwindi by 1861.

Goondiwindi State School opened on 1 September 1864.

Goondiwindi was first proclaimed a municipality on 20 October 1888. The town boundaries have not altered to this day, and, before the Federation of Australia in 1901, the town served as a border crossing between Queensland and New South Wales. The customs house from that era is now a museum.

Goondiwindi East Provisional School opened on 4 July 1898, becoming Goondiwindi East State School in 1909. The school closed about 1914, reopening again in 1920. It finally closed in 1947.

Goondiwindi West Provisional School opened in 1900, becoming Goondiwindi West State School on 1 January 1909. It closed about 1950.

The South Western railway line from Inglewood reached Goondiwindi on 13 October 1908 with the eastern part of the locality being served by  Mooroobie railway station (now abandoned) and the town being served by the Goondiwindi railway station. The next section of railway line from Goondiwindi to Talwood opened on 4 May 1910, with the western part of the locality being served by Hunter railway station (now abandoned).

Goondiwindi North Provisional School opened in 1901, becoming Goondiwindi North State School on 1 January 1909. It closed due to low student numbers about 1911 but reopened on 24 November 1913 as the Moogoon Road State School. The school closed again due to low student numbers in 1925, but reopened in 1931. It finally closed about 1939.

St Mary's Catholic School opened in 1911 operated by the Sisters of Mercy providing for boarding and day students through Years 1 to 7. In 1965, the school added a secondary department to extend the schooling to Year 10 but the secondary department was closed in 1972. The Sisters operated the school until December 1983, after which lay teachers were employed.

The Goondiwindi War Memorial was originally located in Herbert Street and was dedicated on 21 September 1922 by the Queensland Governor, Matthew Nathan. The gates were unveiled in April 1949.

Goondiwindi State High School opened on 28 January 1964.

The most famous resident of Goondiwindi was Gunsynd, a Thoroughbred race horse known as "The Goondiwindi Grey". Guided by Bill Wehlow, in the late 1960s and early 1970s, Gunsynd had 29 wins including the 1971 Epsom Handicap and the 1972 Cox Plate and came third in the 1972 Melbourne Cup. The name "Gunsynd" came from Goondiwindi Syndicate (Gun=Goondiwindi, Synd=Syndicate). There is a statue of Gunsynd in the town centre. There is also a Gunsynd museum located in the Goondiwindi Regional Civic Centre at 100 Marshall Street.

Another school, the Goondiwindi Christian Education Centre, opened in 1991 but closed on 13 December 1996.

The Border Rivers Christian College was established in 2015, as a primary and secondary school (P-12) although only P-8 schooling was available in its first year, with Years 9 to 12 classes commencing each successive year. The school commenced using the buildings of the former Goondiwindi Christian Education Centre at 111 Calladoon Street.

The current Goondiwindi Public Library building was opened in 2015.

Heritage listings

Goondiwindi has a number of heritage-listed sites, including:
 Marshall Street: Goondiwindi War Memorial
 100 Marshall Street: Goondiwindi Civic Centre
 1 McLean Street: Customs House Museum
 Millmerran Road, Wyaga: Wyaga Homestead

Population
According to the 2016 census of Population, there were 6,355 people in Goondiwindi .
 Aboriginal and Torres Strait Islander people made up 5.9% of the population. 
 83.1% of people were born in Australia and 86.6% of people spoke only English at home. 
 The most common responses for religion were Anglican 28.9%, Catholic 28.2% and No Religion 15.7%.

Climate
Goondiwindi experiences a humid subtropical climate (Köppen: Cfa, Trewartha: Cfal), with hot, humid summers and mild, dry winters.

Transport

The town is a major transport nexus between the southern states and Queensland. The Newell, Leichhardt, Gore, Cunningham, Barwon and Bruxner Highways all merge at Goondiwindi or close by. The town is the administrative centre for the Goondiwindi Region. Goondiwindi is a popular stopping point for interstate travellers, and has several motels and restaurants. Goondiwindi Airport is located north of the town off the Cunningham Highway.

Education
Goondiwindi State School is a co-educational government primary school (P-6). In 2016, the school had an enrolment of 514 students with 45 teachers (37 full-time equivalent) and 23 non-teaching staff (18 full-time equivalent). The school opened on 1 September 1864 and is one of the oldest primary schools in Queensland.

Goondiwindi State High School is a co-educational government secondary school (7-12). In 2016, the school had an enrolment of 526 students with 53 teachers (49 full-time equivalent) with 29 non-teaching staff (20 equivalent). The high school opened on 28 January 1964.

St Mary's Parish School is a co-educational Roman Catholic primary and middle school (P-10). In 2017, the school has an enrolment of 395 students.

The Border Rivers Christian College is a co-educational non-denominational primary and secondary Christian school. In 2017, the school is moving to purpose-built premises in Lilly Street, which are expected to included boarding facilities.

These schools are well-established, have solid community ties, and contribute to the community and surrounding areas. Goondiwindi State High School won the 2006 Showcase award, given to schools which display excellence in all areas.

Retailers
Goondiwindi has many large retailers including Coles, two hardware stores Home timber and hardware, a  Mitre 10 Home & Trade, Betta Home Living, The Reject Shop, Repco and a Foodworks (Goondiwindi Co Op) and Price Busters. As part of nationwide restructuring, Target Country closed and was converted into the new K Hub format in early 2021.

Farming
Goondiwindi is a centre for agriculture, producing a diverse range of crops and fibres including wool and beef, cotton, sorghum, corn, wheat, barley and chickpeas. Goondiwindi is well known for its dry season but still lasting in with many crops.

Attractions

Goondiwindi hosts the Natural Heritage and Water Park. The development of the park was the result of the closure of nearby Boobera Lagoon (approximately 20 km west of Goondiwindi) to power boats in order to better preserve artifacts or evidences of indigenous culture. The Lagoon had been a favourite spot for waterskiing for the local area and was the only suitable waterbody for the purpose. The Goondiwindi Town Council petitioned the Australian Government, which responded (through Environment Australia) by funding the National Heritage & Water Park, to make available skiing and boating facilities and to provide a focal point for tourism and recreation in the town and district.

The 210 ha recreational water park opened in early 2004. The purpose built  water channel allows water sports such as waterskiing, wakeboarding, canoeing and boating. It is home to a varied bird life; it provides picnic and swimming areas. Remedial work was performed in 2008 to seal leaks, which caused the lagoon to be dry for a period.

The Goondiwindi Botanic Garden of the Western Woodlands on the western side of the town features 25 hectares of species native to the Upper Darling Basin. It is unique in that plants are displayed in communities merging into each other as occurs in nature. With the first plantings in 1986, many of the upper-storey large trees are approaching maturity, and the focus is now on mid and lower storey plantings.

The Garden has an extensive Eremophila collection. Some 22 plant communities feature endemic species such as brigalow (Acacia harpophylla), belah (Casuarina cristata), Chinchilla white gum (Eucalyptus argophloia), ooline (Cadellia pentastylis), ironbark (Eucalyptus sideroxylon) and gidyea (Acacia aneura). The planting program is supported by an on-site propagation facility comprising a glass house, heater-mister unit, large shade house and storage container.

Owned and run by the community for the community, the Garden features an island surrounded by a deep lake. An outdoor stage in a tranquil bushland setting is used for performances and social events such as weddings and christenings. Frequent use is made of the shelter sheds and barbeques. The Garden is also the home of the Goondiwindi Dragon Boat Club, and the lake is used by the Goondiwindi Triathlon Club for kids' mini tris and the iconic Hell of the West when river conditions are not suitable for the swim leg.

Goondiwindi has an active sporting community, with rugby union, rugby league, cricket, golf, tennis, Australian football, netball, swimming etc. The town built a large indoor gymnasium for use by the general public and school groups. A major sports highlight is the annual "Hell Of The West" triathlon, in February, which sees entrants from across the country.

Boobera Lagoon is a permanent water hole to the west of the town. Bendidee National Park is located a short drive to the north east of the town.

Amenities

Goondiwindi has a range of facilities open to the general public; these include Goondiwindi Waggamba community cultural centre, swimming pool, art gallery, heritage listed custom house museum and a public library. The Goondiwindi Regional Council operates a public library in Goondiwindi at 100 Marshall Street.

Goondiwindi Uniting Church is at 59 Elizabeth Drive. The church was previously at 13 Moffatt Street.

Media
Goondiwindi's weekly newspaper is the Goondiwindi Argus. There are several radio stations, including Now FM 88.7, 2VM 89.5,ABC Local Radio, 92.7, Rebel FM 96.3, Breeze FM 98.7, Tourist Radio 88FM.

Sport
Goondiwindi has a rugby union team which compete in the Darling Downs Rugby Union competition, against such teams as the University of Southern Queensland Rugby Union Club, Toowoomba Rangers Rugby Union Club, Toowoomba City Rugby Club, Roma Echidnas, the Condamine Cods, the Dalby Wheatmen, the Goondiwindi Emus, the Warwick Water Rats and the University of Queensland Rugby Union Club (Gatton Campus).

The town is also host to the Goondiwindi Boars Rugby League Club that competes in the Toowoomba Rugby League, the club has produced many great talents with players going on to play in junior representative sides, the QLD and NSW Cup, NRL and International Rugby League competitions.

Notable residents

Luke Covell - Former NRL and International Player with New Zealand Warriors, Wests Tigers, and Cronulla Sharks. 
Gene Fairbanks - Former Super Rugby Player with the Reds, Brumbies, and Western Force. 
Gunsynd - Famous racehorse known as "The Goondiwindi Grey"
Ethan Lowe - Former NRL Player with the South Sydney Rabbitohs and won a premiership with the North Queensland Cowboys in 2015. Lowe made his debut for the Queensland State of Origin side in 2019. 
Mark Offerdahl - Australian rugby league footballer representing the USA.

See also

 Goondiwindi Border Bridge
 Goondiwindi War Memorial
 Tomkins incident
 Yelarbon, Queensland

References

External links

 
 
Goondiwindi Argus

 
Towns in Queensland
Towns in the Darling Downs
Newell Highway
Goondiwindi Region
1888 establishments in Australia
Populated places established in 1888
Localities in Queensland